Dora Webber and Cora Webber (born December 5, 1958) are twin sisters who participate in women's boxing. They are from the U.S. state of California. It is believed that at one time, they were the only set of twins to actively participate on boxing's women's leg.

Cora Webber was a participant in the sport of karate before she discovered boxing in 1979, and she allegedly left karate because she kept on being disqualified on her karate fights. Her sister Dora followed her footsteps five years later. The Webbers were among the most popular female boxers of the 1980s and kept on facing top opposition well into the 1990s.

Cora's first fight was against a woman named Toni Lear. Cora won the fight by a decision, earning 100 dollars for her efforts. She put a string of wins together, and was able to win the California State women's title. After that, she had a chance to spar with men's Welterweight world champion Carlos Palomino in Los Angeles.

In 1984, Dora followed suit and began a professional boxing career of her own. Her first opponent happened to be none other than her sister's former rival Lear, who, upon meeting Dora, thought that she was fighting Cora and that Cora was just trying to pull some kind of scam. After she was presented with proof that she wasn't fighting Cora but her twin sister Dora, Dora proceeded to beat her by a knockout.

Cora has fought, among others, Marian Trimiar, who was beaten twice by Cora, Belinda Laracuente, who also lost to her, and Bonnie Canino, who defeated her by decision.  She was the IWBF world Lightweight champion, but lost that honor when she fought a unification bout to the IFBA world champion Zulfia Koutdoussova on January 10, 1998 by a decision in Atlantic City. Dora, meanwhile, who has fought Lucia Rijker, was a world champion on the Jr. Middleweight division until she lost the IFBA belt a month after her sister's defeat at the hands of Koutdoussova, by a ten round decision to Gina Guidi.

During 2021, Dora Webber was inducted into the Women's International Boxing Hall of Fame.

Dora Webber's professional boxing record

Cora Webber's professional boxing record

References

External links
Dora and Cora Webber @ Women Boxing Network

1958 births
Living people
American women boxers
Identical twins
Boxers from Los Angeles
American twins
Twin sportspeople
21st-century American women